Oakdale Cemetery is a cemetery in Wilmington, North Carolina that dates from the 19th century.

History
Because existing cemeteries were becoming crowded, a group of citizens bought a 65-acre tract of land east of Burnt Mill Creek, east of the town limits.
The first interment was Annie DeRosset, age 6, on February 5, 1855.  Her father, John DeRosset, was a physician and the first president of the cemetery corporation.

Specialized sections
The cemetery has an enclosed Hebrew Cemetery, dating from 1855, as well as a Masonic section, at least one section for Odd Fellows, a section where the burials formerly at Front Street Methodist church were moved after an 1886 fire and a section for those with no other family.

Confederate Memorial
Along with regular grave sites for Confederate soldiers, a great burial mound was erected by the United Daughters of the Confederacy for the dead Confederate soldiers from the Second Battle of Fort Fisher.  Dedicated in 1872, a bronze statue of a regular soldier stands atop a large circular stone base. The dedication plaque reads, .
According to the University of North Carolina, as many as 367 unknown dead soldiers are buried under the mound.

Notable burials 
 Henry Bacon (1866–1924), architect 
 John D. Barry (1839–1867), Confederate Army officer
 Mary Lily Kenan Flagler Bingham (1867–1917), heiress and philanthropist
 Arthur Bluethenthal (1891–1918), football player and member of the French Foreign Legion
 Ann Preston Bridgers (1891–1967), actress and playwright
 David Brinkley (1920–2003), newscaster
 Elisabeth Chant (1865–1947), painter
 Thomas C. Darst (1875–1948), Episcopal bishop
 George Davis (1820–1896), Confederate senator and Confederate States Attorney General
 Adam Empie (1785–1860), Episcopal priest and President of the College of William & Mary
 Rose O'Neal Greenhow (1813–1864), socialite and Confederate spy
 Sarah Graham Kenan (1876–1968), heiress and philanthropist
 William MacRae (1834–1882), Confederate Army officer
 Charles J. Mendelsohn (1880–1939), professor
 James Owen (1784–1865), U.S. Congressman
 Eliza Hall Nutt Parsley (1842–1920), founding president of the NC Division of the United Daughters of the Confederacy
 M. Warley Platzek (1854–1932), lawyer and New York Supreme Court Justice
 James F. Post (1818–1899), architect
 Thomas Settle (1865–1919), U.S. Congressman
 Alfred A. Watson (1818–1905), Episcopal bishop
 William H.C. Whiting (1824–1865), Confederate Army officer

References

External links
 

Wilmington, North Carolina
1855 establishments in North Carolina
Buildings and structures in Wilmington, North Carolina